= Leslie Dadson =

Australian soldier (1884–1961)

Leslie Dadson MC
- Born: 6 March 1884; Sidmouth, Tasmania, Australia
- Died: 5 May 1961 (aged 77); Launceston, Tasmania, Australia
- Military career
- Allegiance: Australia
- Branch: First Australian Imperial Force
- Service years: 1914–1918
- Rank: Lieutenant
- Service number: 222
- Conflicts: First World War
- Awards: Military Cross; Volunteer Officers' Decoration

Leslie Dadson MC (6 March 1884 in Sidmouth, Tasmania, Australia – 5 May 1961 in Launceston, Tasmania, Australia) was an Australian soldier.
